Mundhinam Paartheney is a 2010 Indian Tamil-language romantic comedy film written and directed by debutant director Magizh Thirumeni, starring newcomers Sanjay, Ekta Ghosla, Lizna, Pooja and Sai Prashanth in lead roles. The film, produced by Manickam Narayanan's Seventh Channel Communications, released on 19 March 2010 to moderate reviews.The Movie is praised for the screenplay, flow of events and comedy. The film's title is inspired by a song from Vaaranam Aayiram.

Plot
The story unfolds in London, where Sanjay, narrates about his 'kind' of girl, and talks about love. Cut to flashback, the hero meets Pooja.

He repeatedly tries to impress her. But he learns that she plans to marry a NRI youth. Then comes Aarthi, a dance tutor. She is a girl with traditional ideas but a modern outlook. Unfortunately, the hero's attempts to settle down with her gets jinxed. Then enters Anu, Sanjay's colleague. How he tries to woo her forms the rest of the story.

Cast
 Sanjay as Sanjay
 Ekta Khosla as Aarthi
 Lizna as Anu
 Pooja as Pooja
 Yogeshwari Killa as Priya
 Sai Prashanth as Dinesh
 Samantha
 Deepak Dinkar as Rajiv
 Lakshmi Priyaa Chandramouli as Prashanthi

Soundtrack

The Music was composed by S. Thaman and Released on Sony Music India.

Reception
Rediff wrote "It might not be a slam-bang action movie with twists at every turn  but Mundhinam Parthene is fairly accurate, humorous portrayal of life in a certain section of the society, deftly told. Definitely worth a watch". HindustanTimes wrote "Mundhinam Paartheney is sadly, a good theme that has not been crafted with care. Indeed, a classic case of an interesting plot spoilt by an awful narrative style". Sify wrote "Magilzh Thirumeni, who has graduated from Gautham Vasudeva Menon School of filmmaking, has come out with flying colors as an independent director with Mundhinam Paartheney. It has a captivating freshness about it though there is nothing new in the story".

References

External links
 

2010 films
2010 romantic comedy films
2010s Tamil-language films
Films scored by Thaman S
Indian romantic comedy films
2010 directorial debut films
Films directed by Magizh Thirumeni